Janez Flere (born 6 May 1959) is an Argentine alpine skier. He competed in two events at the 1980 Winter Olympics.

References

1959 births
Living people
Argentine male alpine skiers
Olympic alpine skiers of Argentina
Alpine skiers at the 1980 Winter Olympics
Place of birth missing (living people)